Raghuvendra Tanwar is an Indian professor and writer. In 2022, he has been awarded Padma Shri by the Indian Government for his contribution in literature and education.

Early life and education
Born in a land owing family of village Lukhi, Kurukshetra, Haryana on 20 Feb. 1955. He holds an academic record of two gold medals in MA History. He is also a known tennis player. He secured his schooling at one of India’s oldest public schools BCS, Shimla and Kurukshetra University.

His wife Prof. Reicha Tanwar is reputed scholar in gender studies and was Professor-Director, Centre for Women Studies, Kurukshetra University, Kurukshetra (Haryana). They have two children Sukarma and Sugandhi

Career
Tanwar joined Kurukshetra University as a lecturer in August 1977. He was appointed as an open selection Professor in 1997 and also worked as the KU's Dean of Academic Affairs and Dean, Faculty of Social Sciences. He superannuated in February 2015. In July 2016, he was appointed Director of the Haryana Academy of History and culture.

He has several important and reputed publications to his credit. These include a seminal and widely acclaimed study of Punjab’s Partition (1947) published in 2006, Reporting the Partition of Punjab (Manohar, New Delhi; Vanguard, Lahore). His recent study is titled, ‘Be Clear Kashmir will vote for India’ (Routledge, London; Manohar, New Delhi). His latest publication is, ‘The Story of India’s Partition’. This is an illustrated story with about 240 photographs (Publication Division, Govt. of India, 2021). His study on the Punjab’s political system in the decades leading to the partition of India was widely claimed. The study was titled, The Politics of Sharing Power : The Punjab Unionist Party 1923-1947.

Awards
 UGC     National Fellowship (Research Award) (2002-2005).
 President Punjab History Conference (Modern), 2001.
 President Indian History Congress (Contemporary),     2008.
 Major UGC Research Project, 2013.
 General President Punjab History Conference, 2018.
 Padma Shri (Education & Literature), 2022.

References

Living people
Recipients of the Padma Shri in literature & education
Year of birth missing (living people)